Turnu Măgurele is a city in Teleorman County, Romania, in the historical region of Muntenia. Developed nearby the site once occupied by the medieval port of Turnu, it is situated north-east of the confluence between the Olt River and the Danube, at the edge of the Wallachian Plain.

The first documentary attestation of the town appears in a diploma issued by Sigismund of Luxembourg, king of Hungary, on the occasion of the battles fought here in 1394. The fortress belonged to the Ottoman Empire, intermittently, between the years 1417-1829, being a turkish raya. During the Iancu Jianu's hajduk raids against the Vidin pasha Osman Pazvantoglu, the fortress was burned and destroyed. After the Russo-Turkish war of 1828-1829, the town became part of Wallachia, as a result of the Treaty of Adrianople. After 1829 the locality is relocated on the nearby hill, near the localities of Odaia and Măgurele, and the fortress is demolished. From 1839 it was the residence of Teleorman county until 1950 and once again from 1952 until 1968, when, following the administrative reorganization, it loses the status of county residence in favor of the city of Alexandria.

The communist urban systematization had a major impact on the town's urban planning and the establishment of the Chemical Fertilizer Plant (1962) transformed the city into an industrial one. Forced urbanization caused the city's population to grow substantially to reach almost 37,000 in 1992.

After the 1989 Revolution, the municipality suffered a sharp decline as a result of the collapse of industrial and economic activities and the migration of the population to the larger cities as well as to other European states.

Geography
A ferry plies across the Danube to the Bulgarian city of Nikopol. There are some vestiges of a Roman bridge across the Danube, built in 330 by Constantine the Great. It is built in the Danube plain in a fertile land called Burnas plain.

History

After the Daco-Roman wars of 101–106 AD, ended by the victory of the Roman armies led by Emperor Trajan and the conquest of Dacia. Emperor Trajan fortified the eastern border of Dacia on the Olt line, building the famous Limes Alutanus, consisting of fortresses and fortresses on either side of the Olt River, from the Danube to the Boița Mountains. Procopius of Caesarea, during the time of Justinian the Great, recalls the city of Turris and points to Trajan as its founder. Some historians identify the fortress with the one discovered at Turnu Măgurele. This assertion is not confirmed; according to archaeological research, the Turnu fortress dates from a later period. Historians and archaeologists have not yet agreed on when the construction of the Danube fortification began: there are theories about a construction from the time of Constantine the Great or even later, from the time of Justinian I, but none of them is fully accepted by historians. What is certain is that during the reign of Mircea the Elder, this settlement played an important role in the defensive strategy of Wallachia in the face of the Ottoman danger.

The first documentary attestation of the fortress of Turnu appears between the years 1393-1394 in a document (from 1397) of the chancellery of Sigismund of Luxembourg. The document describes the context and history of Sigsmund's struggles in support of Mircea the Elder, his vassal, to return to the throne of Wallachia. In this diploma it is mentioned the recapture of the fortress by the troops allied to Mircea:

The fortress will remain under the rule of Wallachia during the reign of Mircea until around 1417, when Turnu came under Turkish rule and was transformed, together with a security zone (established in the depths of Wallachian territory with a radius of 15 km from the fortress), into Turnu raya. The Turks ruled Turnu (Kule in Turkish, Holavnik in Bulgarian) with some intermittencies (between 1462, 1594 - 1600 and 1772 - 1774), during the anti-Ottoman rebellions of Vlad III the Impaler and Michael the Brave, until 1826, when it was ceded to Wallachia through the 1826 Akkerman Convention, along with Giurgiu and Brăila. In 1829, following the Treaty of Adrianople the Turnu, Giurgiu and Brăila rayas were definitively ceded to Wallachia. The fortress was severely damaged and burned by Iancu Jianu's hajduks in their campaign (1809) against Osman Pazvantoğlu and was never rebuilt under Turkish rule. After the town finally became part of the Wallachia it was moved to the nearby hill and renamed Turnu Măgurele (măgurele meaning hillock in Romanian). By a decree issued by Alexandru Dimitrie Ghica, the Prince of Wallachia the town was refounded on 27th February 1836.

Towards the end of World War II, the city served as an unlikely submarine base, as Romania's two modern submarines, Rechinul and Marsuinul, took refuge in the city's port following the Soviet aerial bombardment of Constanța on 20 August 1944.

The village of Islaz, near Turnu Măgurele, was the initial center of the 1848 Wallachian revolution (see Proclamation of Islaz). During the Romanian War of Independence, the town served as a base for the campaign in Bulgaria. After the administrative reform of 1968, it became a municipality. Starting with the 1960s, new apartment blocks were built in the town, however, in smaller numbers as compared to other towns and cities in the country. The newest neighborhood in the town is the Taberei housing estate, nicknamed among the locals as "Katanga", because it was built in the same time as the Katanga conflict in Congo.

Demographics

Natives
 Marian Baban
 George Bălan
 Elie Cristo-Loveanu
 Vali Ionescu
 David Praporgescu
 Ionuț Tîrnăcop
 Nicole Valéry Grossu

Tourist attractions
The major tourist attraction is Saint Haralambios Cathedral in the center of the town. Built by Greek farmers at the beginning of the 20th century, the cathedral is based on the plans of the Curtea de Argeș Cathedral and constructed in a late renaissance style. Another city landmark is the independence monument. It was built in celebration of the major role that Turnu Măgurele played in the Romanian War of Independence (1877-1878).

Economy
A chemical and textile industry center in the past, the city has more recently been diversifying its economy (ElectroTurris - an electrical engine factory, and ConservTurris - a food processing plant).

The chemical plant is notorious for the air pollution (issued gases contain ammonia and hydrogen sulfide at times above the norms), and it quite possibly does not meet the EU ecological (air pollution) requirements.

References

External links

 Turnu Măgurele Official Site

 
Populated places on the Danube
Port cities and towns in Romania
Cities in Romania
Populated places in Teleorman County
Localities in Muntenia
Bulgaria–Romania border crossings
Capitals of former Romanian counties